Krishnankutty Pani Thudangi() is a 2021 Indian revenge horror film directed by Sooraj Tom who has earlier directed ‘Pa.Va’ and ‘Ente Mezhuthiri Athazhangal’. It was released on 11 April 2021 at the same time through Zee Keralam television channel and Zee5 application software.

Plot

Unnikannan is a male homenurse. He arrives at an isolated bungalow in the middle of the forest to take care of an elderly man. When he arrives there, only a girl is in the bungalow, Beatrice. Beatrice tries her best to send Unnikannan back because her father and mother are not at home, but he is not ready to leave. He finds his patient, Beatrice's paralyzed grandfather, who is restless since the arrival of Unnikannan but is threatened by the latter to not cause any trouble.

Unnikannan narrates the story of Krishnankutty, a spirit terrorizing his village, and slyly tells Beatrice that no one would find out if something happened to her in the midst of such a huge estate. She retorts to his indecent advances by frightening him. The duo apparently seem to get along when mysterious incidents begin to take place. Unnikannan finds the severed head of a corpse outside the bungalow and informs Beatrice about it, who in turn reveal to him how her grandmother was murdered by her grandfather and that her spirit is out for vengeance. A terrified Unnikannan urges Beatrice to flee with him but in a horrific twist of events, it is revealed that there is no ghost and it was actually Beatrice who committed the murders, with the help of another man Linto.

Unnikannan finds a diary in the room that he was locked in which reveals her past. Beatrice was a young Sri Lankan girl adopted by a Keralite family. The patriarch of the family, Luca, controlled everyone and was a pedophile who sexually abused Beatrice. The son of her adoptive parents also abused her while they turned a blind eye to her sufferings. After years of torture and abuse, Beatrice attacks Luca and leaves him paralyzed. She yearns for revenge on the whole family. She meets Linto, whose perverted advances she denies initially but then seduces him to carry out her plan. after reading the diary, Unnikannan manages to escape the room about the same time Beatrice and Linto finish disposing off the corpses. She then tries to kill Linto but he tackles her and hits her back. She pushes him down and tries to kill him but when she spots Unnikannan escaping, she runs behind him. He is saved from her when she is tackled by Linto and both of them fall into a pit.

In the next scene, we are shown a bandaged Unnikannan narrating the experience to his friends who refuses to believe him and accuses him of being too lazy to find a job. An irritated Unnikannan walks home alone but is stopped by someone (apparently Krishnankutty's spirit). Fed up, he furiously turns to confront whoever that called him. In the final scene, we see the bloody hand of Beatrice climbing out of the pit.

Cast
Vishnu Unnikrishnan as Unnikannnan
Saniya Iyappan as Beatrice
Santhosh Damodharan as Luyi Paappan
Vijilesh Karayad as Linto
Srikant Murali as Krishnankutty
Dharmajan Bolgatty as Sanoj

References

2020s Malayalam-language films
2021 films
Indian rape and revenge films
Indian films about revenge
Indian feminist films
Films about women in India
Films directed by Sooraj Tom